In mathematics (particularly in complex analysis), the argument of a complex number z, denoted arg(z), is the angle between the positive real axis and the line joining the origin and z, represented as a point in the complex plane, shown as  in Figure 1. 
It is a multivalued function operating on the nonzero complex numbers.
To define a single-valued function, the principal value of the argument (sometimes denoted Arg z) is used.  It is often chosen to be the unique value of the argument that lies within the interval .

Definition

An argument of the complex number , denoted , is defined in two equivalent ways:
Geometrically, in the complex plane, as the 2D polar angle  from the positive real axis to the vector representing . The numeric value is given by the angle in radians, and is positive if measured counterclockwise.
Algebraically, as any real quantity  such that  for some positive real  (see Euler's formula).

The names magnitude, for the modulus, and phase, for the argument, are sometimes used equivalently.

Under both definitions, it can be seen that the argument of any non-zero complex number has many possible values: firstly, as a geometrical angle, it is clear that whole circle rotations do not change the point, so angles differing by an integer multiple of  radians (a complete circle) are the same, as reflected by figure 2 on the right. The argument of zero is usually left undefined.

Alternative Definition
The complex argument can also be defined algebraically in terms of complex roots as:

This definition removes reliance on other difficult-to-compute functions such as arctangent as well as eliminating the need for the piecewise definition. Because it's defined in terms of roots, it also inherits the principal branch of square root as its own principle branch.

Principal value

This is shown in figure 2, a representation of the multi-valued (set-valued) function , where a vertical line (not shown in the figure) cuts the surface at heights representing all the possible choices of angle for that point.

This represents an angle of up to half a complete circle from the positive real axis in either direction.

Some authors define the range of the principal value as being in the closed-open interval .

Notation
Note that notation varies, so  and  may be interchanged in different texts.

Computing from the real and imaginary part

If a complex number is known in terms of its real and imaginary parts, then the function that calculates the principal value  is called the two-argument arctangent function atan2:
.
The atan2 function (also called arctan2 or other synonyms) is available in the math libraries of many programming languages, and usually returns a value in the range .

A compact expression with 4 overlapping half-planes is

It's also possible to use arccotangent for the definition:

For the variant where  is defined to lie in the interval , the value can be found by adding  to the value above when it is negative (when ).

Alternatively, the principal value can be calculated in a uniform way using the tangent half-angle formula, the function being defined over the complex plane but excluding the origin:

This is based on a parametrization of the circle (except for the negative -axis) by rational functions.

A variant of the last formula which avoids overflow is sometimes used in high precision computation:

Identities
One of the main motivations for defining the principal value  is to be able to write complex numbers in modulus-argument form. Hence for any complex number ,

This is only really valid if  is non-zero, but can be considered valid for  if  is considered as an indeterminate form—rather than as being undefined.

Some further identities follow.

Example

Using the complex logarithm

From , it easily follows that . This is useful when one has the complex logarithm available.

Extended Argument
Extended argument of a number z (denoted as ) is the set of all real numbers congruent to  modulo 2.

References

Bibliography

External links
 Argument at Encyclopedia of Mathematics.

Trigonometry
Complex analysis
Signal processing